Uncial 063 (in the Gregory-Aland numbering), ε 64 (Soden), is a Greek uncial manuscript of the New Testament, dated paleographically to the 9th century.

Description 
The codex contains a part of the Luke 16 — John 6, on 20 parchment leaves (26 cm by 19 cm). It is written in two columns per page, 29 lines per page.

It uses breathings and accents. It contains lectionary markings at the margin (for liturgical service).

 Contents
 Luke 16:19-18:14; 18:36-19:44; 20:19-23; 20:36-21:20; 22:6-30; 22:53-24:20.41-fin.;
 John 1:1-3:34; 4:45-6:29.

The Greek text of this codex is a representative of the Byzantine text-type. Aland placed it in Category V. It has some special readings.

It was not examined by the Claremont Profile Method.

In John 1:28 it reads ἐν Βηθανίᾳ ἐγένετο.

History 

It is dated by the INTF to the 9th century.

The codex 063 was divided and now is located in several different places. 14 leaves at the Vatopedi monastery (1219), 6 leaves at the State Historical Museum (V. 137, 181).

Two other leaves of the same codex, registered as 0117 (Gregory-Aland). They were brought from the East by Emmanuel Miller. Currently they are held at the Bibliothèque nationale de France (Suppl. Gr. 1155, II).

See also 
 List of New Testament uncials
 Textual criticism

References

Further reading 

 C. R. Gregory, Textkritik III, pp. 1048-1060.
 C. R. Gregory, "Textkritik des Neuen Testaments", Leipzig 1900, vol. 1, p. 81. (Uncial 0117).
 Kurt Treu, Remarks on some Uncial Fragments of the Greek NT, in Studia evangelica III, T & U 88 (Berlin, 1964), p. 280.

External links 

 Uncial 063 at the Wieland Willker, "Textual Commentary"

Greek New Testament uncials
9th-century biblical manuscripts
Bibliothèque nationale de France collections
Athos manuscripts
Vatopedi